North Union High School is part of the North Union Local School District in northern Union County, Ohio, USA, with an October 2017 district enrollment of 1,520 students within a 162 square mile boundary line. The district is surrounded by farms with business and factories both to the north and south. The campus is located on the northern edge of Richwood. The school is surrounded by the townships of Claibourne, Dover, Jackson, Leesburg, Liberty, Taylor, Washington and York in Union County, and Scioto and Thompson townships in Delaware County.

Sports
In the 2011–12 season, the American football and girls' basketball teams won their third consecutive MOAC titles. The football team advanced to the OHSAA playoffs for the third consecutive year and the girls' basketball team advanced to the District Finals.

In July 2017, North Union announced they would leave the MOAC to join the Central Buckeye Conference, possibly as early as 2018.

During the 2019-20 high school basketball season, North Union completed a perfect 21-0 regular season. The Wildcats entered the OHSAA state tournament as the No. 3 seed in the Division III Central District with a chance to win their first district title since 1970.

References

External links
 District website

High schools in Union County, Ohio
Public high schools in Ohio